Sport Lisboa e Benfica, commonly known as Benfica, is a Portuguese professional football team based in Lisbon. The club was founded on 28 February 1904 as Sport Lisboa and later merged with Grupo Sport Benfica to form Sport Lisboa e Benfica. In terms of overall major trophies won, Benfica is the most decorated team in Portugal.

At regional level, Benfica won 10 Campeonato de Lisboa and a record 18 Taça de Honra. Nationally, they have won a record 37 Primeira Liga titles, a record 26 Taça de Portugal, a record 7 Taça da Liga, 8 Supertaça Cândido de Oliveira, 3 Campeonato de Portugal and a shared record 3 Taça Ribeiro dos Reis. In international football, Benfica won the Latin Cup in 1950 and back-to-back European Cups in 1961 and 1962. In addition to the aforementioned honours, the following list includes trophies in other competitions, Portuguese orders and medals, and other awards pertaining to the club.

Regional titles (28)
 Campeonato de Lisboa
 Winners (10): 1909–10, 1911–12, 1912–13, 1913–14, 1915–16, 1916–17, 1917–18, 1919–20, 1932–33, 1939–40
 Taça de Honra
 Winners (18) – record: 1919–20, 1921–22, 1962–63, 1964–65, 1966–67, 1967–68, 1968–69, 1971–72, 1972–73, 1973–74, 1974–75, 1977–78, 1978–79, 1979–80, 1981–82, 1983–84, 1985–86, 1987–88

National titles (84)
 Primeira Liga
 Winners (37) – record: 1935–36, 1936–37, 1937–38, 1941–42, 1942–43, 1944–45, 1949–50, 1954–55, 1956–57, 1959–60, 1960–61, 1962–63, 1963–64, 1964–65, 1966–67, 1967–68, 1968–69, 1970–71, 1971–72, 1972–73, 1974–75, 1975–76, 1976–77, 1980–81, 1982–83, 1983–84, 1986–87, 1988–89, 1990–91, 1993–94, 2004–05, 2009–10, 2013–14, 2014–15, 2015–16, 2016–17, 2018–19

 Taça de Portugal
 Winners (26) – record: 1939–40, 1942–43, 1943–44, 1948–49, 1950–51, 1951–52, 1952–53, 1954–55, 1956–57, 1958–59, 1961–62, 1963–64, 1968–69, 1969–70, 1971–72, 1979–80, 1980–81, 1982–83, 1984–85, 1985–86, 1986–87, 1992–93, 1995–96, 2003–04, 2013–14, 2016–17

 Taça da Liga
 Winners (7) – record: 2008–09, 2009–10, 2010–11, 2011–12, 2013–14, 2014–15, 2015–16

 Supertaça Cândido de Oliveira
 Winners (8): 1980, 1985, 1989, 2005, 2014, 2016, 2017, 2019

 Campeonato de Portugal
 Winners (3): 1929–30, 1930–31, 1934–35

 Taça Ribeiro dos Reis
 Winners (3) – shared record: 1963–64, 1965–66, 1970–71

International titles (3)
 European Cup
 Winners (2): 1960–61, 1961–62

 Latin Cup
 Winners (1): 1950

Other competitions
 Three Cities Trophy (Lisbon, Porto, Vigo): 1913
 Four Cities Trophy (Lisbon, Porto, Madrid, Lausanne): 1915–16
 Easter Trophy (Lisbon): 1924–25
 Ramón de Carranza Trophy: 1963, 1971
 Small Club World Cup: 1965
  Badajoz Trophy: 1968–69, 1972–73
 Salamanca Trophy: 1972–73
 Porto Wine Trophy: 1972–73
 Los Angeles Trophy: 1974–75
 Belo Horizonte Trophy: 1974–75
 Braga Trophy: 1976–77
 Tournoi de Paris: 1979
 FC Schalke 04 Trophy (Gelsenkirchen): 1979–80
 Toronto Trophy: 1980–81, 1981–82, 1982–83, 1986–87
 Iberian Cup: 1983
 Lisbon Trophy: 1983–84, 1985–86, 1986–87
  Maputo Trophy: 1985–86
 Teresa Herrera Trophy: 1987
 Trofeo Cidade de Vigo: 1989
 Pepsi Cup: 1993
 Memoriale Cecchi Gori: 1996
 Middlesbrough Trophy: 1998
 Coppa Nereo Rocco: 1999
 Taça Amizade: 1999, 2001
 Guadiana Trophy / Algarve Football Cup: 2002, 2007, 2009, 2010, 2011, 2016, 2017, 2022
 Dubai Cup: 2007
 Cidade de Guimarães Trophy: 2008, 2009, 2010
 Amsterdam Tournament: 2009
 Eusébio Cup: 2009, 2011, 2012, 2022
 Pedro Pauleta Trophy: 2009
 CNE Cup: 2009
 Albufeira Summer Cup: 2010
 Festa d'Elx Trophy: 2013
 Torneio Internacional do Sado: 2018
 Taça Hospital da Luz: 2019
 International Champions Cup: 2019

Orders, medals, awards
 Commander of the Military Order of Christ (1932)
 Officer of the Order of Merit (1936)
 Medal of the Order of Prince Henry (1979)
 Medal of Sports Merit (1954)
 Medal of Honour of Sports Merit (1981)
 Collar of Honour of Sports Merit (1988)
 France Football European Team of the Year: 1968
 kicker Sportmagazin 7th Greatest Club of the 20th Century (1998)
 12th in FIFA Club of the Century (2000)
 9th in IFFHS Top 200 European clubs of the 20th century (2009)
 Globe Soccer Awards Best Club Academy: 2015, 2019

References

External links
 

Honours
H